The Uttar Pradesh Subordinate Services Selection Commission (UPSSSC) is the state organization authorized to conduct  civil service examinations  for appointments to various Group C and Group D posts. The UPSSSC conducts various examinations within the state of Uttar Pradesh. The Uttar Pradesh Subordinate Services Selection Commission was constituted under the provisions of the U.P. Subordinate Services Selection Commission Act 2014 (often shortened to UPSSSC Act 2014). The current commission was formed after it was recognised that there was a need for a recruitment drive to attract people to Group 'C' and Group 'D' positions within the state departments dealing with civil services .

Functions of UPSSSC
Recruitment of the candidates.

Examinations conducted by the Commission

The following examinations are conducted by the U.P. Subordinate Services Selection Commission from time to time:
Junior Assistant Examination.
 Bus and Transport Conductor Examination
 Clerk, Junior Assistant, Stenographer Examination.
Forest Guard Examination.
 Boring Technician
 Lekhpal, Patwari and Ameen Examinations.
 Pharmacist (Medical)
 Revenue Inspector Examination
Junior Engineer Examination
 Village Development Officer/ Village Panchayat Officer, Samaj Kalyan Paryavekshak Examination.
Driver, Peon and Multitasking Staff Recruitment Exam
Tubwell Operator
Lower Subordinate Services
Cane Supervisor
Computer Operator 
Assistant Statistical officer
 Tyre Inspector/Vidutkar/Mechanic Examination.
 Yuva Vikas dal Adhikari and Sports Trainer Examination.
Wild Life Guard 
Assistant Accountant & Auditor Examination
Preliminary Eligibility Test (PET).

See also
 Uttar Pradesh Public Service Commission
 List of Public service commissions in India

References

External links 
 UPSSSC Official Website

State agencies of Uttar Pradesh
Employment agencies of India
Government recruitment in India
1999 establishments in Uttar Pradesh
Government agencies established in 1999